Moel Eilio is a mountain in Snowdonia, North Wales, that is situated approximately 3 miles north-west of Snowdon itself. It has two subsidiary tops, Foel Gron and Foel Goch (Eilio).  The average annual temperature of the mountain is around 6 degrees Celsius.  During the winter season, some significant accumulations of snowfall is known to take place on Moel Eilio, due to its relatively flat, grassy slopes.

A popular ascent starts from Llanberis and climbs by way of Bwlch y Groes and then the north ridge of the hill.

Moel Eilio, Foel Gron, Foel Goch and Moel Cynghorion form a curved ridge tracking generally south-west towards Snowdon and  can provide a less common route to ascend Snowdon.

A small lake lies below the summit; Llyn Dwythwch.

References

External links
 www.geograph.co.uk : photos of Moel Eilio and surrounding area
 Walking Routes to the Summit of Moel Eilio

Betws Garmon
Llanberis
Waunfawr
Mountains and hills of Gwynedd
Mountains and hills of Snowdonia
Hewitts of Wales
Marilyns of Wales
Nuttalls